Lingannapet is a village in the Karimnagar district of Telangana, India.It has a population of about 5200.

Villages in Karimnagar district